The William S. Bailey House is a historic house located at 100 South Campbell Street in Macomb, Illinois. The house was built in 1887 for William S. Bailey, a prominent local businessman who built several of the buildings on Macomb's town square. The house has a Queen Anne style design with Eastlake details; it is one of the best-preserved Queen Anne homes in Macomb. The -story house has a hipped roof with cross gables; the gable ends are decorated with spindlework cresting. Three brick chimneys with patterned masonry provide ventilation for the house's fireplaces and kitchen stove. The front porch features a spindlework railing and decorative trim along the roof and the entry pediment.

The house was added to the National Register of Historic Places on August 28, 2012.

References

Houses on the National Register of Historic Places in Illinois
National Register of Historic Places in McDonough County, Illinois
Houses completed in 1887
Queen Anne architecture in Illinois
Relocated buildings and structures in Illinois